Saint Kitts and Nevis and the United Kingdom have a long history of colonial activity and later diplomatic relations.

During the late 17th century, France and England battled for control over Saint Kitts. It was ceded to Britain in 1713. Saint Kitts and Nevis, along with Anguilla, became an associated state with full internal autonomy in 1967. Anguillians rebelled, and separated from the others in 1971. Saint Kitts and Nevis achieved independence in 1983.

Saint Kitts and Nevis maintains a High Commission in South Kensington in London. In turn, the United Kingdom maintains a High Commission in Bridgetown, Barbados which also serves as High Commission to Saint Kitts and Nevis.

See also  
 Foreign relations of Saint Kitts and Nevis 
 Foreign relations of the United Kingdom

References

External links 
British High Commission, Bridgetown

 
United Kingdom
Bilateral relations of the United Kingdom
Relations of colonizer and former colony